Horizon de Beaulieu Chartres was a French association football club, most recently known as Chartres Horizon. They were based in the town of Chartres and their home stadium was the Stade de Beaulieu. In May 2018, the club merged with FC Chartres to form C'Chartres Football.

References

External links
HB Chartres club information at fff.fr 

Defunct football clubs in France
HB Chartres

Association football clubs disestablished in 2018
2018 disestablishments in France
Sport in Eure-et-Loir
Football clubs in Normandy